Farmakida Cove (‘Zaliv Farmakida’ \'za-liv far-ma-'ki-da\) is the 7 km wide cove indenting for 3.3 km the northeast coast of Alexander Island in Antarctica. It is entered south of Nicholas Point, and has its head fed by Roberts Ice Piedmont. It is surmounted by Mount Calais on the southwest. The feature is named after the ancient Thracian fortress of Farmakida in Southeastern Bulgaria.

Location

Maps
 British Antarctic Territory. Scale 1:200000 topographic map. DOS 610 – W 69 70. Tolworth, UK, 1971
 Antarctic Digital Database (ADD). Scale 1:250000 topographic map of Antarctica. Scientific Committee on Antarctic Research (SCAR). Since 1993, regularly upgraded and updated

References
 Bulgarian Antarctic Gazetteer. Antarctic Place-names Commission. (details in Bulgarian, basic data in English)
 Farmakida Cove. SCAR Composite Gazetteer of Antarctica

External links
 Farmakida Cove. Copernix satellite image

Bodies of water of Alexander Island
Landforms of Alexander Island
Bulgaria and the Antarctic